The erstwhile Kadic Hospital, also known as Kadic Medical Centre, was an urban, private, hospital in Kampala, the capital of Uganda and the largest city in that country. The hospital was taken over by Victoria Hospital Limited and renamed UMC Victoria Hospital in January 2017. Following the commissioning of the newly constructed state-of-art UMC Victoria Hospital across the road, the facility was decommissioned in January 2018 and is expected to be re-opened soon. UMC Victoria Hospital set-up a dedicated COVID centre inside the erstwhile Kadic Hospital to serve patients during the COVID-19 pandemic in 2020-2021.

Location
The hospital is located on Kira Road, in the Bukoto neighborhood, on Naguru Hill, in Kampala, Uganda's capital city. The coordinates of Kadic Hospital are: 0°20'59.0"N, 32°36'15.0"E (Latitude:0.349717; Longitude:32.604159).

Overview
In 1991, married couple Henry Kasozi and Sayuni Kasozi started the Kampala Diagnostic and Imaging Centre (KADIC), out of rented premises in Naakulabye, a middle and low income neighborhood in Kampala's Lubaga Division. Henry was about to retire as a professor of radiology at Makerere University School of Medicine, where he taught between 1974 and 1993.

Within two years, they outgrew their rented premises. They acquired land in Bukoto and built new premises that houses the main hospital. They maintain clinics at three other locations in the city, including in Naakulabye, where they started. As of 2014, the hospital employed over 130 people, owned four ambulances, and treated over 4,000 outpatients and inpatients every month, with a monthly salary payroll exceeding Sh100 million.

In 2016–17, the facility (KADIC Hospital - Bukoto) was purchased by Victoria Hospital Limited and renamed UMC Victoria Hospital.

Affiliated entities

 Victoria Hospital Limited, in addition to the erstwhile KADIC Hospital, also operates:
UMC Victoria Hospital - state-of-art newly constructed tertiary care hospital opposite erstwhile KADIC

See also
 List of hospitals in Uganda

References

External links
 Website of Kadic Health Services Limited
 Website of UMC Victoria Hospital

Hospitals established in 1991
Hospitals in Kampala
1991 establishments in Uganda